Henry Leonard or Lennard may refer to:

Centre Henry-Leonard
Harry Leonard (footballer) (1886–1951)
Henry Leonard of Hay, New South Wales
Henry Leonard, owner of Taunton Iron Works
Henry Leonard, candidate in Colorado's 3rd congressional district
Henry Lennard, 12th Baron Dacre (1570–1616), a politician.
Sir Henry Lennard, 2nd Baronet (1859–1928), of the Lennard baronets

See also
Harry Leonard (disambiguation)